Akmeemana Dayarathana Thero is a Sri Lankan politician and a former member of the Parliament of Sri Lanka. Thero was born in Akmeemana, Galle. His mother's name is Siriyawathi and his father was Mr. Sumatipala. Thero was in parliament from 2004 to 2010.

References

Living people
Sri Lankan Buddhist monks
Jathika Hela Urumaya politicians
Members of the 13th Parliament of Sri Lanka
United People's Freedom Alliance politicians
1970 births